D'Oyly Carte may refer to any of the following:

People
Richard D'Oyly Carte, Victorian theatrical impresario and hotelier
Rupert D'Oyly Carte, Richard's son, English hotelier and proprietor of the D'Oyly Carte Opera Company
Helen Carte
Bridget D'Oyly Carte, Rupert's daughter, English hotelier and proprietor of the D'Oyly Carte Opera Company

Other uses
D'Oyly Carte Opera Company
D'Oyly Carte Island in the River Thames, England, UK

See also

Gilbert and Sullivan
Savoy Hotel
Savoy Theatre

 D'Oyly
 Carte (disambiguation)